Thomas Dan Friedkin (born 1965) is an American billionaire businessman, heir and film director. He is the owner and CEO of The Friedkin Group and its subsidiary Gulf States Toyota, which was founded by his father, Thomas H. Friedkin. He is also the owner and president of the football club A.S. Roma. As of February 2023, his estimated net worth is US$5.7 billion.

Early life
Dan Friedkin was born in San Diego, California, the son of Thomas H. Friedkin. He has a bachelor's degree from Georgetown University, and a master's from Rice University.

Career
After Dan's father Tom turned 65, he turned over responsibility for running the holding firm and its 3,000 employees to son Dan, but remained chairman and was content to dispense advice.
At age 35, Dan Friedkin was the CEO of Gulf States Toyota and Friedkin Group. 

Since 2013, Friedkin has served as chairman of Auberge Resorts Collection, a portfolio of luxury resorts, hotels and vacation properties in the U.S., Mexico, Costa Rica, Europe, Caribbean, and Fiji.

In 2017, Friedkin co-formed 30WEST, providing capital and guidance to creative projects and companies. In 2018, Friedkin and 30WEST acquired majority ownership in NEON, a theatrical marketing and distribution company that distributed the Academy Award-winning film Parasite.

In December 2019, Friedkin started negotiations to purchase the Italian football club A.S. Roma, and on August 6, 2020, signed the preliminary contract to agree to pay $591 million to James Pallotta, the main shareholder of Roma.

Friedkin is the co-founder and principal at Imperative Entertainment, a studio specializing in the development, production and financing of original and branded entertainment across all platforms focusing on film, television and documentaries. Imperative Entertainment films include The Square (Palme d'Or at the 2017 Festival de Cannes), All the Money in the World and The Mule. Imperative Entertainment is also producing the 2021 film Killers of the Flower Moon, which will star Leonardo DiCaprio. Friedkin was also the director of the 2019 film The Last Vermeer. In addition, Friedkin has been recognized for his work in the film Dunkirk with a Taurus Stunt Award for Best Specialty Stunt. Friedkin piloted an authentic Spitfire through an aerial dogfight, landing on the beach at Dunkirk.

Personal life
He and his wife Debra have four children, and live in Houston.

Friedkin is the founder and chairman of the Air Force Heritage Flight Foundation and "one of nine civilian Heritage Flight pilots qualified to fly in formation with US. Air Force single-ship demonstration teams". Friedkin flies a variety of high-performance vintage military aircraft, performing in aerobatic air shows across North America and Europe with the U.S. Air Force and the Horsemen P-51 Flight Team.

An avid golfer, Friedkin built the Congaree golf course in South Carolina that was designed by Tom Fazio. Congaree has a philanthropic model of providing educational and vocational opportunities for underserved youth with a passion for golf.

He is also the owner of Diamond Creek Golf Club in North Carolina which he purchased from Wayne Huizenga in 2012. Diamond Creek Golf Club is ranked as one of America's 100 Greatest Golf Courses by Golf Digest.

Friedkin is heavily involved in conservation efforts through the Friedkin Conservation Fund, which works to protect millions of acres of endangered wildlife areas and stimulate community development in East Africa. FCF also conducts research and monitoring in order to make effective wildlife management decisions and promote long-term sustainability of wildlife and their wilderness.

Friedkin is also the Chairman-Emeritus of the Texas Parks and Wildlife Commission, which manages and conserves the natural and cultural resources of Texas.

In 2014, Friedkin and Texas Parks and Wildlife Foundation, along with other conservation organizations, made the largest conservation investment in Texas history when they purchased the 17,351-acre Powderhorn Ranch to preserve one of the largest remaining tracts of unspoiled coastal prairie in Texas.

In August 2019, Friedkin was voted chair of Project Recover, a collaborative effort to enlist 21st century science and technology in a quest to find and repatriate Americans missing in action since World War II.

References

1965 births
Living people
Businesspeople from Houston
Italian football chairmen and investors
American people of Russian-Jewish descent
American film directors
American billionaires
Rice University alumni
Georgetown University alumni
20th-century American businesspeople
21st-century American businesspeople
A.S. Roma non-playing staff